The 2017 Città di Como Challenger was a professional tennis tournament played on clay courts. It was the twelfth edition of the tournament which was part of the 2017 ATP Challenger Tour. It took place in Como, Italy between 28 August – 3 September 2017.

Singles main-draw entrants

Seeds

 1 Rankings are as of 21 August 2017.

Other entrants
The following players received wildcards into the singles main draw:
  Riccardo Balzerani
  Alessandro Coppini
  Matteo Donati
  Julian Ocleppo

The following player received entry into the singles main draw as a special exempt:
  Elias Ymer

The following players received entry from the qualifying draw:
  Gianluca Di Nicola
  Lenny Hampel
  Constant Lestienne
  Corentin Moutet

The following players received entry as lucky losers:
  Federico Gaio
  Kamil Majchrzak

Champions

Singles

  Pedro Sousa def.  Marco Cecchinato 1–6, 6–2, 6–4.

Doubles

  Sander Arends /  Antonio Šančić def.  Aliaksandr Bury /  Kevin Krawietz 7–6(7–1), 6–2.

References

Città di Como Challenger
Città di Como Challenger
August 2017 sports events in Italy
September 2017 sports events in Italy